The 2007 Superbike World Championship was the twentieth FIM Superbike World Championship season. The season started on 24 February at Losail and finished on 7 October at Magny-Cours after 13 rounds.

The main title contenders were 2004 champion James Toseland on a Honda, 2006 champion Troy Bayliss on a Ducati, former MotoGP rider Max Biaggi on a Suzuki, and Noriyuki Haga on a Yamaha. Bayliss spent the season riding a Ducati 999, even though production of the 999 had ended in 2006 and the bike had been replaced by the Ducati 1098. To satisfy homologation requirements, Ducati produced 150 limited edition 999 models.

The championship was won by James Toseland in the final race of the season. Toseland's 415 points gave him a 2-point margin over Haga, with Biaggi in third position with 397 points. The manufacturers' championship was won by Yamaha.

This was also the final season Corona Extra provided title sponsorship, having done so since 1998. From 2008 HANNspree took on this role in a deal up to and including the 2010 season.

Race calendar and results

1. – Second race at Silverstone was cancelled due to heavy rain.

Championship standings

Riders' standings

Manufacturers' standings

Entry list

All entries utilized Pirelli tyres.

On 20 March DFX Honda dropped Steve Martin from their rider lineup due to a lack of funds. On 27 March DFX Honda and Steve Martin reached an agreement which saw the rider on track at Donington and from there, on a race by race basis for the next three races.

References

 
Superbike World Championship seasons
World Championship